Louisiana's 12th State Senate district is one of 39 districts in the Louisiana State Senate. It has been represented by Republican Beth Mizell since 2016.

Geography
District 12 covers all of Washington Parish and the northernmost parts of St. Tammany and Tangipahoa Parishes, including some or all of Bogalusa, Franklinton, Kentwood, Amite, and Hammond.

The district overlaps with Louisiana's 1st and 5th congressional districts, and with the 72nd, 74th, 75th, 77th, and 86th districts of the Louisiana House of Representatives.

Recent election results
Louisiana uses a jungle primary system. If no candidate receives 50% in the first round of voting, when all candidates appear on the same ballot regardless of party, the top-two finishers advance to a runoff election.

2019

2015

2011

Federal and statewide results in District 12

References

Louisiana State Senate districts
St. Tammany Parish, Louisiana
Tangipahoa Parish, Louisiana
Washington Parish, Louisiana